O'Byrne may refer to:

 O'Byrne family, an Irish clan
 O'Byrne (surname), including a list of people with the name

See also
 Byrne (disambiguation)
 O'Beirne (disambiguation)